Firuzabad-e Bala (also Romanized as Fīrūzābād-e Bālā, and Fīrūzābād Bālā; also known as Fīrūzābād) is a village in Forumad Rural District, in the Central District of Meyami County, Semnan Province, Iran. At the 2006 census, its population was 103, in 31 families.

References 

Populated places in Meyami County